The Gargoti Museum is a museum in the town Sinnar near Nashik in Indian state of Maharashtra that houses a collection of natural mineral & gem specimens collected by K.C.Pandey over 40 years. The word "goti" refers to a Marathi word meaning stone or pebble. This is India's 1st & only Gem, Mineral & Fossil Museum. It is the world's biggest “Private” Gem & Mineral Museum. It also houses the largest & the finest collection of Indian Zeolite Minerals & Crystals in the world.

Details
Gargoti Museum houses the largest & the finest collection of Indian Zeolite Minerals & Crystals in the world. It is divided into two galleries namely Deccan Plateau Gallery and Prestige Gallery. There are 2 floors in the museum and has vast collection of minerals and crystals. It is located 32 km from Nashik on Nashik-Shirdi highway in a town named Sinnar.

Deccan Plateau Gallery
This section displays Zeolite Minerals & Crystals excavated from the Deccan region of Mother India mainly Maharashtra & surroundings States.

Thissinclude sinclude - 
 Zeolite, Mineral & Crystal Specimens
 Fossils of Shells Extinct Dinosaurs & Mammoth
 Finest quality of Statues carved out of Precious/Semi-Precious stones
 The Fluorescent Mineral Display

Prestige Gallery
This section displays  the exclusive & the rarest finds of our Mother Nature from India & around the world.

This includes -
 Gem, Precious/Semi-Precious Stones
 Precious/Semi-Precious Metals
 Rocks from Moon & Mars
 The best of Indian Zeolite Minerals

The Prestige Gallery, designs are inspired by the Indian Parliament's Monument and showcases a glimpse of the spell bounding treasures of Nature.

Overall content
 The museum displays Worldwide Collection of following: 
 Natural Crystals
 Zeolites, Minerals
 Gem Stones
 Precious Stones & Metals
 Semi-Precious Stones & Metals
 Fossils
 Statues
 Handicrafts

Gallery

References

External links

Museums in Maharashtra
Mineralogy museums
Tourist attractions in Nashik district